The Diamond Challenge Sculls is a rowing event for men's single sculls at the annual Henley Royal Regatta on the River Thames at Henley-on-Thames in England. First run in 1844, it is open to male scullers from all eligible rowing clubs.

The Diamond Challenge Sculls, the Wingfield Sculls and the London Cup in the Metropolitan Regatta make up the "Triple Crown" of the three premier single sculling events in the United Kingdom.

Winners

See also
Rowing on the River Thames

References

Events at Henley Royal Regatta
Rowing trophies and awards
Recurring events established in 1844